Friendly is the surname of:

 Alfred Friendly (1911-1983), American journalist and editor
 David T. Friendly (born 1956), American film producer
 Ed Friendly (1922-2007), American TV producer
 Fred W. Friendly, former president of CBS News
 Henry Friendly, judge of the United States Court of Appeals for the Second Circuit
 Michael Friendly (born 1945), a professor of psychology at York University in Ontario, Canada